Composers from Praetorius through W.F. Bach to Rachmaninoff and Richard Strauss spent a significant amount of time in the German city of Dresden. Composers who only stayed briefly in Dresden for concerts are not included.

Renaissance and Baroque

Classical and Romantic

Contemporary

Further composers residing in Dresden include:
Arcangelo Califano
Friedrich Suppig

References

 
Culture in Dresden